Vila Aurora is a train station on CPTM Line 7-Ruby, in the district of Jaraguá in São Paulo.

History
Because of the  distance between Jaraguá and Perus stations, the Prefecture of São Paulo suggested to the State Government the construction of Vila Aurora station between them in the Director Plan of the Subprefecture of Pirituba.

After a brief start, the construction was put on hold in 2010 because of disagreements between CPTM and consortium companies, which quit the construction. The work was resumed in the end of 2010 by the Heleno & Fonseca Construtécnica S/A consortium, which place second in the bidding, by the cost of R$ 26,000,000 (US$ ). After more delays, the station was opened on 9 September 2013, by the cost of R$ 40,300,000 (US$ ), above the original budget.

References

Companhia Paulista de Trens Metropolitanos stations
Railway stations opened in 2013